The Korg Z1 is a physical modelling sound synthesiser released in 1997. Touted as a polyphonic Prophecy, the Z1 implements 13 synthesis types, all derived from the original OASYS synthesizer.

Overview 
The Korg Z1 uses the same Multi-Oscillator Synthesis System (MOSS) tone generator found in the Korg Prophecy. The MOSS tone generator is a direct descendant of the later abandoned Korg OASYS (Open-Architecture SYnthesis System) development platform. Later implementations of the MOSS tone generator were available as optional expansion boards for the Korg Trinity and Triton workstations.

Options 
ADAT I/O
An ADAT expansion available providing 48 kHz digital output, as well as word clock input.
DSPB-Z1 expansion board
A DSP board that adds 6 voices of polyphony to the Z1, totaling in 18 voices of polyphony.
ZMC-01 card
A blank RAM PCMCIA card
ZSC-01 card
A PCMCIA card containing 256 programs, 32 multisets and 15 arpeggio patterns.

Synthesis Algorithms 
The MOSS system, as implemented on the Z1, offered 13 different synthesis algorithms in the form of programmable oscillators. The various synthesis algorithms employed various synthesis techniques such as physical modeling synthesis, analog modeling synthesis, and Korg's own VPM synthesis. Some of the various synthesis algorithms can be combined to create a vast range of sound.

Standard Oscillator 
A standard virtual analog oscillator, this oscillator generates the standard waveforms typically used by an analog synthesizer such as sawtooth waveforms, pulse waveforms, and triangle waveforms. Wave shaping is available to add various harmonic characteristics to the generated sound.

Comb Filter 
This oscillator creates pitched sound from noise or an impulse. It can create a wide variety of sounds—not only noisy sounds, but also sounds ranging from synth-bass to strings.

VPM (Variable Phase Modulation) 
Korg's own first version of phase modulation synthesis, producing digital timbres similar to the phase modulation synthesis (marketed as frequency modulation synthesis) made famous by Yamaha's DX line, Synclavier, and their successors.

Ring Modulation 
This oscillator simulates ring modulation, a popular feature of analog synthesizers

Cross Modulation 
Modeling frequency modulation (FM) between two analog oscillators. See also VPM above.

Oscillator Sync 
This oscillator simulates hard oscillator sync, a popular feature of analog synthesizers.

Organ Model 
A drawbar organ emulation with 3 stops per oscillator, yielding 6 stops using both oscillators.

Resonance 
Noise is filtered through multiple notch filters to produce noisy organ-like timbres.

Electric Piano Model 
This oscillator is a physical model of an electric piano such as the Fender Rhodes piano. Programmable parameters for the hammer include hammer force, hammer width, and hammer noise. For the tone generator, programmable parameters include decay time, release time, overtone level, overtone frequency, and overtone decay. For the electronic pickup, programmable parameters include pickup position in relation to the tone generator (such as a tine).

Brass Model 
This oscillator is a physical model of a lip-reed instrument such as a trombone, trumpet, or tuba. Programmable parameters include Inst, which selects a previously modeled instrument to specify the length and shape of an instrument, Pressure, which  changes the force of air being blown into the instrument, Lip, which replicates the tonality changes caused by the shape and tension of the player's lips, and Bell, which modifies the shape of the instrument's bell and creates the relevant tonal changes.

Reed/Wind Model 
The reed model is a physical model of a woodwind reed instrument. Programmable parameters include Inst Type (giving you the choice of various physically modeled instruments: HardSax 1, HardSax 2, HardSax 3, SoftSax 1, SoftSax 2, DoubleReed 1, DoubleReed2, Bassoon, Clarinet, Flute 1, Flute 2, PanFlute, Ocarina, Shakuhachi, Harmonica 1, Harmonica 2, and Reed Synth) and programmable reed characteristics.

Plucked String Model 
This oscillator is a physical model of a plucked string instrument such as a violin being played pizzicato or a guitar. Programmable parameters include adjustable attack parameters, damping parameters, decay parameters, string parameters such as string position, string dispersion, harmonics parameters, and various pickup parameters similar to those on the Electric Piano oscillator.

Bowed String Model 
The bowed string model is a physical model of the scraping of a bow across a string on a stringed instrument such as the cello. Programmable parameters include bow speed and bow pressure. The bowed string model emulates various elements of a bowed string sound, such as attack harmonics, providing a more detailed sound than a typical sample-based synthesizer would normally be capable of.

See also 
 Korg Prophecy
 Korg Trinity
 Korg Triton
 Virtual analog synthesizer
 Korg OASYS
 Korg Kronos
 Physical modeling synthesis

References

Further reading

External links 
 Korg Website
 Polynominal.com | Z1 Page: audio clips, tips and manual

Virtual analog synthesizers
Z
Polyphonic synthesizers
Digital synthesizers